In metadata, a match report is a report that compares two distinct data dictionaries and creates a list of the data elements that have been identified as semantically equivalent.

Use of match reports 

Match reports are critical for systems that wish to automatically exchange data such as intelligent software agents.  If one computer system is requesting a report from a remote system that uses a distinct data dictionary and all of the data elements on the report manifest are included in the match report the report request can be executed.

Match reports are useful if data dictionaries use a metadata tagging system such as the UDEF.

See also
Data dictionary
Data warehouse
Metadata
Semantic equivalence
Universal Data Element Framework

Knowledge representation
Data management
Technical communication
Metadata